The Chief of Staff to the President of Nigeria is a high-ranking official who manages the Office of the President. The position was created by President Olusegun Obasanjo in 1999, modelled after the White House Chief of Staff; and its duties are assigned by the President but primarily focused on managing the flow of information and people; advising the president on various issues – through these roles the position wields considerable influence.

List

History 
In May 1999, President Olusegun Obasanjo appointed Abdullahi Mohammed, previously the National Security Adviser as the first Chief of Staff to the President, he continued in this role until after the first year of the Umaru Yar'Adua presidency, with his Deputy Gbolade Osinowo succeeding him. President Yar'Adua abolished the office, and instead relied on a group of close advisers.

Following President Yar'Adua's death, his successor Goodluck Jonathan assumed office as acting president. In a bid to consolidate his nascent presidency, Jonathan appointed his ally Mike Oghiadomhe as Chief of Staff and General Aliyu Gusau as his National Security Adviser. In February 2014, Oghiadomhe resigned from the position and was replaced by General Jones Arogbofa.

In 2015, Muhammadu Buhari won the presidential election. In August 2015, he appointed Abba Kyari as Chief of Staff. Following President Buhari's first illness and medical vacation, Kyari grew increasingly powerful and increasingly clashed with the Vice President Yemi Osinbajo. In 2019, Buhari ordered his cabinet to pass all government correspondences and requests through Abba Kyari, making him the principal channel of communication between the president and the government.

On 17 April 2020, Abba Kyari died of COVID-19. On 13 May 2020, Ibrahim Gambari was appointed as chief of staff.

See also 

 President of Nigeria
 Aso Rock Presidential Villa

References 

Nigerian government officials
Positions of authority